Jagdgeschwader 53 (JG 53)  was a Luftwaffe fighter-wing of World War II. It operated in Western Europe and in the Mediterranean.
Jagdgeschwader 53 - or as it was better known, the "Pik As" (Ace of Spades) Geschwader - was one of the oldest German fighter units of World War II with its origins going back to 1937. JG 53 flew the various models of the Messerschmitt Bf 109 throughout World War II.

World War II
Invasion of France; Battle of Britain

The Geschwader commenced its wartime operations with a high proportion of its personnel experienced ex-Condor Legion pilots including Werner Mölders. On 14 May 1940, JG 53 claimed some 43 victories in one day. The Battle of France thus saw the Geschwader score heavily during May and June 1940, with some 275 claims against Armee de l'Air and Royal Air Force forces.
While JG 53 was making a reputation for itself during the Battle of Britain, according to RAF Air Ministry intelligence summary no. 60, Reichsmarschall Hermann Göring was informed that Major Hans-Jürgen von Cramon-Taubadel's wife was Jewish. Göring then ordered the whole of Stabschwarm/JG 53 to remove the "Pik As" emblem from their planes, and replace it with a red stripe around the engine cowling as punishment. All of Stab./JG 53's planes immediately were stripped of their "Pik As" insignia, and soon after the whole of the Stab./JG 53 had also stripped the swastikas off the tails of their planes in protest.

Invasion of the Soviet Union
In April 1941 the Geschwader then transferred to the Eastern Front for Operation Barbarossa. Under the control of Luftflotte 2 commanded by Field Marshal Albert Kesselring, the Geschwader, now equipped with the Messerschmitt Bf 109F, flew operations from Warsaw-Bielany.
On 31 July 1941 JG 53 shot down its 1,000th aircraft. In the period 22 June 1941 – 5 December 1941 JG 53 claimed to destroy 762 Soviet aircraft, losing 35 in aerial combat, and two on the ground.

Mediterranean theatre
Later in the year JG 53 moved to bases in Sicily for operations against Malta (though elements also served in the Netherlands from July to November 1941). The III. Gruppe was transferred to North Africa for a short time in December 1941 while the rest of JG 53 was eventually moved to Comiso in Sicily for operations against Malta, which ended in May 1942. In the summer of 1942, II./JG 53 operated from the island of Pantelleria for operations over Malta and as escort missions for attacks on British supply convoys.

In May 1942 after the termination of the German air offensive against the British island fortress of Malta in the face of a strong defence bolstered by Supermarine Spitfires the "Pik As" Geschwader was split up, with its three Gruppen scattered over three theatres of operation.  III./JG 53 again saw service in North Africa supporting Rommel's planned advance on Cairo. Stab and II./JG 53 which were left behind on Sicily after the end of the "Malta Blitz" in May for service over the central Mediterranean, and I./JG 53 was moved to the Eastern front, where it was to take part in the German summer offensive in the southern sector aimed at Stalingrad and the Caucasus.

Battle of Stalingrad
Together with the JG 3 and JG 52, plus Stab and II./JG 77, I./JG 53 was deployed in Luftflotte 4's 8th Air Corps to support Operation Blau. During the period May–September 1942 in the Eastern Front, I./JG 53 claimed 918 victories. It suffered the loss of 34 Bf 109s, 18 pilots killed in action and nine wounded.

During the Battle of Stalingrad, the I./JG 53 faced stiff resistance of the Soviet VVS and PVO both in the air and the ground, and several of the unit's aces were shot down, wounded, captured or killed.
 30 June 1942: A Yak-1 fighter shot down Leutnant Joachim Louis's Messerschmitt Bf 109, who bailed out and became a POW. Louis had then 22 victories to his credit.
 8 July 1942: Wilhelm Crinius (then an Unteroffizier with 12 air victories) was shot down by flak over Voronezh at 8:50 hs.
 6 August 1942: Leutnant Hans Röhrig (flying Bf 109G-2 W.Nr 13480) is forced to bail out by a Yak-1 fighter, apparently flown by Soviet ace Starshiy Leytenant Mikhail Baranov (183 IAP, 269 IAD). At that time Röhrig had under his belt eight out of the 75 victories he would be credited with. Baranov subsequently would shoot down the Ju 87D-3 of Unteroffizier Herbert Oswald (2./StG 2), one of the Stukas the I. Gruppe was escorting.
 19 August 1942: Walter Zellot's Bf 109 was shot-up by a Soviet fighter, probably the Yak-1 flown by future ace Boris M. Vasilyev (929 IAP).
 7 September 1942: While escorting a Fw.189A-1 of 4.(H)/10, 10-victories ace Feldwebel Wilhelm Budke was caught by surprise by Soviet Yak-7B ace Amet-khan Sultan (4 IAP), and had to bail out of his Bf 109 G-2 W.Nr. 13680. Amet-Khan's comrade ace Ivan Stepanenko shot up the Fw 189, which was damaged beyond repair (65%) and was scrapped.
 8 September 1942: 38-victories ace Oberfeldwebel Hans Kornatz was downed and injured in air combat, probably by Spanish Yak-1 pilot José Pascual Santamaría (788 IAP, 102 IAD PVO), who shot down three Bf 109 that day, but was also forced to bail out and died when his parachute failed to open.
 9 September 1942: 60-kills ace Leutnant Alfred Franke (flying a Bf 109, 2./JG 53) was downed in air combat by Ilyushin Il-2 Shturmovik pilot Pavel S. Vinogradov (694 IAP, 228 ShAD) and was killed in the crash.
 10 September 1942: three I./JG 53 pilots were killed or wounded over Stalingrad: Unteroffizier Heinrich Wöhrle (10 victories, WIA), Feldwebel Franz Hagedorn (37 victories, killed by another Il-2 Shturmovik) and Leutnant Walter Zellot (86 victories), who was shot down and killed by flak.
 13 September 1942: While escorting Ju 88s, 11-victories ace Unteroffizier Erwin Meier (2./JG 53) jumped the Yak-1 of female pilot Raisa Belyaeva. However, he was surprised by another Yak-1 flown by future leading female ace Lydia Litvyak and had to bail out of his flaming Bf 109 G-2. He became a POW.

North Africa

On 1 November 1942, Hauptmann "Tutti" Müller was appointed Gruppenkommandeur of I./JG 53 and led the unit back to the Mediterranean theater. By November 1942 the entire wing was again concentrated on Sicily for an offensive against Malta, an abortive and short-lived blitz foiled by the defenders. During its 1942 operations over North Africa, Sicily and Malta JG 53 had claimed a total of 388 aircraft shot down. Hauptmann Gerhard Michalski claimed 25 over Malta. With the Allied invasion of French North Africa in November, the Geschwader again found its components separated.

"Defense of the Reich"
II./JG 53 was withdrawn from Italy in October 1943, and was the first squadron of the unit to be employed in the Defense of the Reich operations, stationed near Vienna from October 1943 to March 1944, before moving to south Western Germany. The winter of 1943/44 saw bitter fighting over Italy.

II./JG 53 was the sole squadron employed against the Allied Operation Overlord on 6 June 1944. The Luftwaffe fighter units in France suffered catastrophic losses, and II./JG 53 was no exception. In just one month of operations, the squadron reported 42 aircraft lost through enemy action, 18 in accidents, 20 abandoned and a further 20 through other causes; approximately 200% of its operational strength.

III./JG 53 also returned from Italy in June 1944 and after a short period refitting was active in operations against the Allied forces. When the Allies launched Operation Market Garden, both II. and III./JG53 took part. A new IV. Gruppe was added in the autumn of 1944.

I./JG53 was later moved to Romania to protect the oilfields of  Ploiești and also saw further action in Hungary in late 1944 and early 1945 against the Red Army. It retreated into Czechoslovakia and Austria and was disbanded in April 1945. The rest of the unit was disbanded days before VE Day.

Commanding officers
Geschwaderkommodore

GruppenkommandeureI./JG 53II./JG 53III./JG 53IV./JG 53Ergänzungsgruppe
 Hauptmann Hubert Kroeck November 1940

Notes

References

Citations

Bibliography

 
 
 
 
 Williamson Murray, Luftwaffe (Grafton Books 1985)
 Jochen Prien,  Jagdgeschwader 53- A History of the "Pik As" Geschwader  (v. 1),  (v.2),  (v.3)
 Prien, Jochen - Stemmer, Gerhard - Rodeike, Peter - Bock, Winfried Die Jagdfliegerverbände der Deutschen Luftwaffe 1934 bis 1945 - Teil 9 Tielband II Wom Sommerfeldzug 1942 bis zur Niederlage von Stalingrad 1.5.1942 bis 3.2.1943, Struve Druck (2006).

 
 

Jagdgeschwader 053
Military units and formations established in 1939
Military units and formations disestablished in 1945